José del Villar (born 28 June 1943) is a Spanish former sports shooter. He competed at the 1968 Summer Olympics and the 1976 Summer Olympics.

References

1943 births
Living people
Spanish male sport shooters
Olympic shooters of Spain
Shooters at the 1968 Summer Olympics
Shooters at the 1976 Summer Olympics
20th-century Spanish people